Scopelosaurus is a genus of waryfishes.

The generic name is from the Greek words σκόπελος (skopelos, "lanternfish") and σαῦρος (sauros, "horse mackerel").

Species
There are currently 14 recognized species in this genus:
 Scopelosaurus adleri (Fedorov, 1967)
 Scopelosaurus ahlstromi Bertelsen, G. Krefft & N. B. Marshall, 1976 (Ahlstrom's waryfish)
 Scopelosaurus argenteus Maul, 1954 (Waryfish)
 Scopelosaurus craddocki Bertelsen, G. Krefft & N. B. Marshall, 1976
 Scopelosaurus gibbsi Bertelsen, G. Krefft & N. B. Marshall, 1976
 Scopelosaurus hamiltoni Waite, 1916 (Smallscale waryfish)
 Scopelosaurus harryi Mead, 1953 (Scaly paperbone)
 Scopelosaurus herwigi Bertelsen, G. Krefft & N. B. Marshall, 1976
 Scopelosaurus hoedti Bleeker, 1860 (Hoedt's waryfish)
 Scopelosaurus hubbsi Bertelsen, G. Krefft & N. B. Marshall, 1976
 Scopelosaurus lepidus G. Krefft & Maul, 1955 (Blackfin waryfish)
 Scopelosaurus mauli Bertelsen, G. Krefft & N. B. Marshall, 1976 (Maul's waryfish)
 Scopelosaurus meadi Bertelsen, G. Krefft & N. B. Marshall, 1976 (Blackring waryfish)
 Scopelosaurus smithii B. A. Bean, 1925

References

Notosudidae